R1SE was a Chinese idol boy band, formed by Tencent through the 2019 reality show Produce Camp 2019 on Tencent Video. The group consisted of 11 members: Zhou Zhennan, He Luoluo, Yan Xujia, Xia Zhiguang, Yao Chen, Zhai Xiaowen, Zhang Yanqi, Liu Ye, Ren Hao, Zhao Lei,  Zhao Rang.

They made their debut on June 8, 2019 with the debut song "R.1.S.E". R1SE is a time-limited boy group. The group officially disbanded on June 14, 2021, after two years of active promotion.

Name
The band name, "R1SE" is the acronym for "Running", "Number 1", "Sun" and "Energy". The name also represents the will to improve and continue rising to become China's number one boy band. Their name can be pronounced either as "R. One. S. E." (English: /ɑr, wʌn,ɛs,i/) or simply "RISE" (English: /ɹaɪz/).

History
R1SE was formed through the reality television show Produce Camp 2019 aired from April 6 to June 8, 2019. It was the second season of Produce 101 China. On the live broadcast of the finals, it was announced that Zhou Zhennan placed first, followed by He Luoluo, Yan Xujia, Xia Zhiguang, Yao Chen, Zhai Xiaowen, Zhang Yanqi, Liu Ye, Ren Hao, Zhao Lei and Zhao Rang respectively. The center and leader position was given to the first-place winner, Zhou Zhennan.

Most members are from different groups and companies before the show, from 8 June 2019 to 8 June 2021, all management rights are in the hand of Wajijiwa Entertainment.

Members

 Zhou Zhennan / Vin Zhou (周震南)
 He Luoluo / Stark He (何洛洛)
 Yan Xujia / Davis Yan (焉栩嘉)
 Xia Zhiguang / X-Light Xia (夏之光)
 Yao Chen / Ivan Yao (姚琛)
 Zhai Xiaowen / Bill Zhai (翟潇闻)
 Zhang Yanqi / YoRoll Zhang (张颜齐)
 Liu Ye / Yea Liu (刘也)
 Ren Hao / P.O.I Ren (任豪)
 Zhao Lei / Ray Zhao (赵磊)
 Zhao Rang / Ryan Zhao (赵让)

Discography

Extended plays

Songs

Tours 
 WE ARE R.1.S.E - 2019 R1SE National Tour Concert (Guangzhou & Chongqing）Remark: Concert in Shanghai, originally scheduled for 8 Feb, was cancelled due to COVID-19.
 SUNR1SE premiere（曜为名首唱会）(Sept.23rd 2020)  Remark：online
 我们 破晓星辰 告别限定演唱会 (R1SE Farewell concert limited) (May.2&3.2021) (Shanghai)
 我们 破晓星辰 告别限定演唱会 - 最终场暨告别典礼 (R1SE Farewell concert limited - Final Farewell) (June.13.2021) (Beijing) Remark：online and offline

Variety Shows

Variety shows 

 Super R1SE (Super R1SE·蓄能季) (11 August 2019 - 10 November 2019) released on Tencent Video
 Autumn with 11 youths (十一少年的秋天) (1 December 2019 - 5 January 2020) released on Tencent Video
 Super R1SE season 2 （Super R1SE·周年季）（5 July 2020 - 29 August 2020）released on Tencent Video
Before sunrise (我们 破晓之前）（29 April 2021- 21 May 2021) released on Tencent Video

Accolades

2019 

 GQ Men of the Year 2019 - Group of the Year
 Asia Songboard - Most popular new group
 COSMO Glam Night - Group of the Year
 TMEA Tencent Music Awards - Best Group Album of the Year
 Tencent All Star Awards 2019 - Group of the Year (Male)

2020 

 Tencent Entertainment White Paper Awards - Group of the Year
 Weibo Night Awards - Best Group of the Year
 2020 MTV Europe Music Award for Best Greater China Act
 Beijing Music Exposition (BME) - Best Group of the Year
 ELLEMEN Film Hero 2020 - Group of the Year
Tencent All Star Awards 2020 - Best Album "曜为名" (SUNR1SE)
Asian pop music awards 2020 - Best Chinese Group of the Year
Asian pop music awards 2020 - Most Popular Boy Group
CCTV's/Yang Video - Most Popular Newcomer of the year
28th STYLE GALA 精品风格云盛典 - Annual Popular Team

References

External links
 R1SE on Sina Weibo

Chinese boy bands
Mandopop musical groups
Chinese pop music groups
Chinese dance music groups
Mandarin-language singers
Produce 101
Produce 101 (Chinese TV series) contestants
Musical groups established in 2019
2019 establishments in China
2021 disestablishments in China
Musical groups disestablished in 2021